Andrew Michael Stadler (born January 5, 1988) is an American soccer player who plays as a forward for Vasalunds IF.

Career
Stadler started out playing youth soccer for the local club Polonia SC which his grandfather had founded after immigrating over to America from Poland during World War II. After playing for his high school he received a scholarship to join the George Washington Colonials men's soccer college team. During his time in college Stadler scored 35 goals in 60 games and was on the watchlist for the Hermann Trophy during his senior year. After graduating he could not even find a trial with an American club and instead had to work as a concierge until a friend contacted him about the opportunity to play for Färila IF in the sixth tier of Sweden.

After only playing three games for Färila he was signed by fourth tier club Sandvikens IF where he remained for the following two and a half years. During his time with the club they played against Malmö FF in the Svenska Cupen where Stadler left a good impression on the Malmö assistant manager Jörgen Pettersson. And when Pettersson took over as manager for Superettan side Landskrona BoIS he signed Stadler to the club. At the end of his first season with Landskrona the club was relegated but the following summer he returned to Superettan when he was bought by league leaders Östersunds FK. The club was promoted to the top tier at the end of the year and in the third round of the 2016 Allsvenskan Stadler both assisted and scored for the first time in a top flight as Östersund recorded their first ever Allsvenskan victory.

Stadler left Dalkurd FF at the end of 2018, after playing for the club since March 2017. On February 3, 2019, Stadler then joined Syrianska FC.

On February 3, 2020, it was announced that Stadler had signed with Akropolis IF. As of 2022, he plays for Ettan club Vasalunds IF.

Personal life
Stadler has a bachelor's degree in criminal law. He also has a brother Timothy Stadler, who received a master's degree in geophysics from Michigan State University, researching with Dr. Masako Tominaga. While attending MSU, Timothy played on the MSU men's club soccer team and lead them to numerous victories.

Career statistics

References

External links

Elitefootball profile
George Washington University profile

1988 births
Living people
American soccer players
American people of Polish descent
Association football forwards
Association football midfielders
Syrianska FC players
Dalkurd FF players
Östersunds FK players
Landskrona BoIS players
Sandvikens IF players
George Washington Colonials men's soccer players
Allsvenskan players
Superettan players
Ettan Fotboll players
Division 2 (Swedish football) players
American expatriate sportspeople in Sweden
American expatriate soccer players
Expatriate footballers in Sweden
Soccer players from Wisconsin
People from Wauwatosa, Wisconsin
Akropolis IF players
Vasalunds IF players